Pomani (possibly from Aymara puma cougar, puma, -ni a suffix to indicate ownership, "the one with a puma") is a mountain in the Andes of southern  Peru, about  high. It is situated in the Moquegua Region, Mariscal Nieto Province, Torata District. Pomani lies south-west of the volcano Tutupaca and north-west of the mountain Chuquiananta. The Asana River originates near the mountain.

References

Mountains of Peru
Mountains of Moquegua Region